Chicka Chicka 1, 2, 3 is the name of a children's picture book written by Bill Martin, Jr. and Michael Sampson, and illustrated by Lois Ehlert in 2004 by Simon & Schuster. The book features anthropomorphized numbers.

Plot
The number 0 wants to climb up an apple tree but ends up watching the numbers from 1 to 20 (including the number 5 wearing a top hat) in counting order, then 30 to 90 by tens (including the number 70 with long hair), and finally 99, climb it. As the numbers were climbing, 0 wondered if there would be a place for him. But as they all come before him, there is no room for him, until a group of bumblebees claim the tree by angrily ordering the numbers to get out of their tree for a misunderstanding. While counting backwards, the bumblebees fly around them, causing all the numbers (except 10 who was hiding, but including 99 who immediately falls out before the rest and what was continued right after the bumblebees told the numbers to get out of the tree), to fall out of the tree. Also, while falling down, 11 gets bent up, 8 gets a crack (broken bone), and 6 gets twisted. The number 0 now knows where he would be in the apple tree. He goes to the top of the tree and joins with 10 to make the number 100, which scares all the bees away, and all the other numbers (with 8 now wearing a bandage) convene in the tree to cheer for 10 and 0's bravery after the misunderstanding ends.

Development
The publisher, S&S, originally asked Bill Martin, Jr. to write a sequel to his book Chicka Chicka Boom Boom.  But when he and co-author Michael Sampson turned the manuscript in, it was rejected.  That manuscript was published by Henry Holt as the title "Rock It, Sock It, Number Line."  5 years later Martin and Sampson wrote a second counting book, and it became Chicka Chicka 1, 2, 3.

Reception
The book quickly became a best-seller, and is used by teachers throughout the United States to teach counting and place value to young children. There is also a complete list of numbers at the back of the book, too. The number eight is different from the bandaged one. It does not have a bandage, like the one who fell right out of the tree and he got a crack.

Awards
The book has won numerous awards from a variety of publications, libraries, and parenting groups, including Best Book of 2004 by Parenting Magazine.

Adaptations
Weston Woods produced an animated cartoon of the book in 2005, complete with music and song composed and performed by Crystal Taliefero.

References

External links
Michael Sampson personal website
Bill Martin, Jr. personal website

American picture books
2004 children's books
Mathematics books
Mathematics fiction books